Fra Kristiania-Bohêmen is a novel from 1885 by Norwegian writer Hans Jæger.  The book was confiscated  shortly after its publication, and Jæger was sentenced to prison and lost his position as stenographer at the Parliament.

Plot
The novel is set in Christiania, and deals with the everyday life of two friends, "Herman Ek" and "candidate Jarmann". They live in lodgings and spend their days drinking in cafés, discussing philosophy, literature and society reforms. "Jarmann" ends his life by committing suicide, shooting himself after spending his last night with a prostitute. The novel is a roman à clef, as the characters are easily recognizable as real people: "Ek" is Jæger himself, and "Jarmann" also has a corresponding real person.

Confiscation and trial
The book was immediately banned by the Ministry of Justice, and the police managed to confiscate most of the printed copies shortly after its publication. He also lost his position as a stenographer at the Parliament of Norway. Jæger was defended in court by barrister Ludvig Meyer. The Supreme Court decision became the subject of a fierce debate. Liberal and conservative newspapers mostly supported the government's actions and the court decision, while intellectuals raised their voices in support of freedom of speech. The confiscation of Kristiania-Bohêmen sparked a debate on freedom of press in 1886 in the literary, cultural and political magazine  Nyt Tidsskrift. The novel gave its name to a literary movement in Norway in the 1880s (in ), which included, in addition to Jæger, Christian Krohg, Gunnar Heiberg, Ludvig Meyer, Arne Garborg and others. Their "program" was based on naturalism, and also included elements of socialism and anarchism. Discussions on morals and sexuality had started early in the 1880s, and the debate became even more heated after the confiscation of Jæger's book in 1885, of Krohg's novel Albertine in 1886, and the imprisonment of Jæger.

Re-issue
When the novel was re-issued in 1950, it spurred no debate or government action.

References

19th-century Norwegian novels
1885 novels
Novels set in Oslo
Censorship in Norway